Dimitar Yanakiev (born 26 May 1950) is a Bulgarian former rower. He competed at the 1972 Summer Olympics, 1976 Summer Olympics and the 1980 Summer Olympics.

References

1950 births
Living people
Bulgarian male rowers
Olympic rowers of Bulgaria
Rowers at the 1972 Summer Olympics
Rowers at the 1976 Summer Olympics
Rowers at the 1980 Summer Olympics
World Rowing Championships medalists for Bulgaria